Stefan Jędrychowski (19 May 1910 – 26 May 1996) was a Polish communist politician, economist and journalist, who served as deputy prime minister, foreign minister and finance minister in Poland.

Early life and education
Born in Warsaw on 19 May 1910, Jędrychowski hailed from a middle-class Catholic family, who owned properties and apartment houses in Wilno, in the Russian part of Poland. His mother was of German origin.

He studied law and social science at Stefan Batory University in Wilno, graduating in 1932. Then he obtained a master's degree in law from the same university. He also received a PhD in economics. He began his political career as a radical leftist Catholic in the group called "Odrodzenie" (renaissance) when he was an undergraduate student. Then he switched to a youth organization "Legion Mlodych" (The Legion of Youth) that was founded by Józef Piłsudski after he took over the Polish government in 1926. Jędrychowski became a member of the group's regional command.

Career and activities
Jędrychowski began his career as an assistant lecturer in economics at Stefan Batory University. In 1936, he joined the Communist Party. In September 1939, he began to work as a journalist in Wilno. Then he was named deputy editor of the local communist daily which had been published by the Soviet authorities. He became a Soviet citizen and a member of the Soviet Communist Party. Following the annexation of Lithuania to the Soviet Union he served at the Supreme Soviet as a deputy.

Later he continued his activities in the Polish committee of national liberation’ (PKWN), which was formed on 22 July 1944. Shortly after he began to serve as the PKWN's representative in Moscow. He was also the Warsaw government's delegate in France in 1945. In addition, he headed the department of information and propaganda under the PKWN. From 1945 to 1947 he served as minister of navigation and foreign trade in the national unity government. Next he joined the Polish United Workers' party. And he became an alternate member of the party's central committee or politburo.

He served as the vice president or deputy prime minister at the Polish cabinet, also known as Rada Ministrów, from 12 December 1951 to 24 October 1956. He worked as the head of the planning office, Komisja Planowania, from 1956 to 1971. He was also promoted to the full membership of the party's central committee on 21 October 1956, being one of nine members. At the committee he assumed the post of chief economic advisor.  He served as the minister of foreign affairs from 22 December 1968 to 22 December 1971. In December 1971, his membership at the central committee of the party ended. Next he was named minister of finance on 22 December 1971, and his term ended on 21 November 1974.

Death
Jędrychowski died in Warsaw on 26 May 1996.

References

External links

20th-century Lithuanian politicians
20th-century Polish journalists
1910 births
1996 deaths
Ambassadors of Poland to the Soviet Union
Ambassadors of Poland to Hungary
Communist Party of Poland politicians
Communist Party of the Soviet Union members
First convocation members of the Supreme Soviet of the Soviet Union
Journalists from Warsaw
Lithuanian communists
Lithuanian Soviet Socialist Republic people
Members of the Politburo of the Polish United Workers' Party
Deputy Prime Ministers of Poland
Finance Ministers of Poland
Ministers of Foreign Affairs of Poland
Members of the State National Council
Members of the Polish Sejm 1947–1952
Members of the Polish Sejm 1952–1956
Members of the Polish Sejm 1957–1961
Members of the Polish Sejm 1961–1965
Members of the Polish Sejm 1965–1969
Members of the Polish Sejm 1969–1972
Politicians from Warsaw
People from Warsaw Governorate
Polish Workers' Party politicians
Polish people of German descent
Recipients of the Order of the Cross of Grunwald, 3rd class
Recipients of the Order of the Builders of People's Poland
Recipients of the Order of the Banner of Work
Vilnius University alumni